Hathorne is a surname. Notable people with the surname include:

John Hathorne (1641–1717), American merchant and judge, son of William
William Hathorne (1606–1681), American merchant

See also
Hathorn
Hawthorne (surname)